El Parrón is an underground metro station on the Line 2 of the Santiago Metro, in Santiago, Chile.

The station was inaugurated on 22 December 2004 as part of the southern Line 2 extension alongside La Cisterna.

References

Santiago Metro stations
Railway stations opened in 2004
Santiago Metro Line 2